The Treaty of Peterswaldau was signed in Peterswaldau on 6 July 1813 between Great Britain and Russia to strengthen the Sixth Coalition against Napoleon. Britain agreed to pay for a German legion of 10,000 troops in Russian service.

See also
List of treaties

References

Sources
Clare, Israel Smith. Library of Universal History: Containing a Record of the Human Race from the Earliest Historical Period to the Present Time Embracing a General Survey of the Progress of Mankind in National and Social Life, Civil Government, Religion, Literature, Science and Art. R. S. Peale, J. A. Hill, 1897 (Original from the New York Public Library).

1813 treaties
Treaties of the United Kingdom (1801–1922)
Treaties of the Russian Empire
Military alliances involving the United Kingdom
Military alliances involving Russia
Russia–United Kingdom relations
July 1813 events
Bilateral treaties of Russia
Bilateral treaties of the United Kingdom